Procervulus is an extinct species of deer found in Europe. It possessed horns that were not shed.

References

Prehistoric deer
Prehistoric mammals of Europe
Prehistoric even-toed ungulate genera
Miocene even-toed ungulates